Lonyae Durell Miller Jr. (born April 29, 1988) is a former American football running back in the National Football League for the Dallas Cowboys, Oakland Raiders, Seattle Seahawks and Baltimore Ravens. He played college football at Fresno State University.

Early years
Miller was born in Los Angeles, California and grew up in Fontana, located in neighboring San Bernardino County. He graduated from Henry J. Kaiser High School of Fontana in 2006.

As a senior, he rushed for 2,567 yards (fourth in the state) on 277 carries, had a 9.27-yard per carry average and scored 34 touchdowns. He rushed for more than 100 yards in every game and had seven contests of 200 or more yards. He had 277 rushing yards and four touchdowns against Coachella Valley High School. He also played defensive back, registering 19 tackles (16 solo) and 2 interceptions. He received third-team All-state, All-CIF Southern Section and Sunkist League Offensive MVP honors.

He competed in track & field as a sprinter, recording personal-best times of 10.7 seconds in the 100 meters and 21.9 seconds in the 200 meters.

College career
Miller accepted a football scholarship from Fresno State University. As a true freshman, he appeared in 10 games and was the backup behind running back Dwayne Wright, tallying 288 rushing yards (second on the team) on 54 carries with 2 touchdowns. He led the team with 16 carries for 113 yards and a touchdown against Hawaii.

As a sophomore, he started 8 out of 10 games and was third on the team behind true freshman Ryan Mathews, with 624 yards on 132 carries and scored 7 touchdowns.

As a junior, even though Mathews missed time with a knee injury, Miller was also limited with injuries and missed the game against Louisiana Tech University. Anthony Harding ended up taking over as the rushing leader of the team. Miller rushed for 844 yards (second on the team) on 120 carries (6.8-yard avg.) and scored 7 touchdowns. Among his highlights were 161 rushing yards (including a 90-yard run) with two touchdowns against Hawaii and 181 rushing yards, including an 80-yard touchdown against Idaho.

As a senior, he remained a backup and his production dropped as Mathews led the nation in rushing with an average of 150.67 yards per contest in 12 games. Miller also fell behind freshman Robbie Rouse, posting 367 rushing yards (third on the team) on 68 carries (5.2 yards avg.), with 9 receptions for 38 yards. He finished his college career with 45 games, 2,062 rushing yards on 374 carries and 20 touchdowns in his four seasons. He also made 14 receptions for 91 yards.

Professional career

2010 NFL Combine

Dallas Cowboys
Miller was signed as an undrafted free agent by the Dallas Cowboys after the 2010 NFL Draft on April 30. He was waived on September 4, but was signed to the practice squad a day later. After Marion Barber suffered a calf injury, he was promoted to the active roster on December 3, to be the team's third-string running back and play on special teams. In 2011, he was passed on the depth chart by running back Phillip Tanner and was released on September 3.

Oakland Raiders
On December 7, 2011, he was signed by the Oakland Raiders to their practice squad. He was released on August 31, 2012.

Seattle Seahawks
On September 27, 2012, he was signed by the Seattle Seahawks to the practice squad. He was cut on October 2.

Baltimore Ravens
On December 18, 2012, he was signed by the Baltimore Ravens to the practice squad. He was considered part of the roster when the team won Super Bowl XLVII. He was released on May 3, 2013.

Personal life
Miller's father (Lonyae Miller Sr.), was a special education teacher in the Fontana Unified School District.

References

1988 births
Living people
Sportspeople from San Bernardino County, California
People from Fontana, California
Players of American football from California
American football running backs
Fresno State Bulldogs football players
Dallas Cowboys players
Oakland Raiders players
Seattle Seahawks players
Baltimore Ravens players